Peace, Nonviolence and Empowerment - Gandhian Philosophy in the 21st Century was a conference held in New Delhi January 29–30, 2007. The conference was held to commemorate the centenary of Mohandas Gandhi's satyagraha movement. It was organized by the Indian National Congress. 122 organizations from 90 countries participated in the conference. A number of Nobel Prize laureates attended the event, including Desmond Tutu, Lech Walesa and Professor Mohammed Yunus. Nelson Mandela addressed the meeting via satellite link.

Congress President Sonia Gandhi attended all four panel sessions of the conference. The conference appealed to the United Nations to declare Gandhi's birthday (October 2) as the International Day of Non-Violence. Subsequently, on June 15, 2007, the United Nations General Assembly unanimously adopted October 2 as International Day of Non-Violence, a motion tabled by the Indian Minister of State for External Affairs Anand Sharma. The conference appealed to create an international civil society forum to institutionalize Gandhian approach of non-violence.

Domestically, the conference received criticism for being used to promote the political ascendancy of Rahul Gandhi. However, Rahul Gandhi held a fairly low profile at the event.

Participants

The following people (among other people not listed in the following list) attended this conference:
  David Holly
  Lyonpo Khandu Wangchuk
  Marta Suplicy
  Liu Hongcai
  Abune Paulos
  Abune Paulos
  Berhanu Adello
  Gerima W. Kirkos
  Shaista Shameem
  Jan-Erik Enestam
  Philippe Humbert
  George Khutsishvili
  Sebastian Edathy
  Christian Bartolf
  Willy Wimmer
  Asiedu Nketia
  Adams Iddie Kofi
  Barbara Serwaa Asamoah
  Shirley A. Botchwey
  George Papandreou
  George Papandreou
  Tzannis Tzannetakis
  Katerina Georgopoulou
  Lia Papafilippou
  Paulina Lampsa
  Radha Kumar
  Jusuf Kalla
  Francesco Rutelli
  Maumoon Abdul Gayoom
  Pawel Zalewski
  Janez Drnovsek
  Ahmed Kathrada

References

2007 in India
Gandhism
International conferences in India